Ramón Castilla District is one of four districts of the province Mariscal Ramón Castilla in Peru. The district was named after Ramón Castilla.

References

External links
Map of Ramón Castilla District El Instituto Nacional de Estadística e Informática (INEI)

Districts of the Mariscal Ramón Castilla Province
Districts of the Loreto Region